John David "JD" Cullum (born March 1, 1966) is an American actor who made his film debut in the CBS Afternoon Playhouse Special Revenge of the Nerd in 1983, playing a jock.

Early life and family
Cullum was born in New York City, the son of John Cullum, a noted Broadway actor, and Emily Frankel, a novelist, playwright, choreographer, and dancer. He grew up in Manhattan and currently resides in Los Angeles where he is a longstanding member of the Antaeus Theater Company.

Filmography

Television

Film

Video games

References

External links 
 
 
 JD Cullum at Internet Off-Broadway Database

1966 births
Male actors from New York City
American male film actors
American male stage actors
American male television actors
Living people
People from Manhattan
20th-century American male actors
21st-century American male actors
American male video game actors